Simiane-Collongue is a commune in the Bouches-du-Rhône department in the Provence-Alpes-Côte d'Azur region of southern France.

Population

See also
Communes of the Bouches-du-Rhône department

References

External links
Official website

Communes of Bouches-du-Rhône
Bouches-du-Rhône communes articles needing translation from French Wikipedia